Johannes Kerkorrel (27 March 1960 – 12 November 2002), born Ralph John Rabie, was a South African singer-songwriter, journalist and playwright.

Career
Rabie, who was born in Johannesburg, worked as a journalist for the Afrikaans newspapers Die Burger and Rapport. In 1986, Rabie started performing politically themed cabaret at arts festivals under his new stage name (kerkorrel meaning church organ in Afrikaans). At that time, apartheid was at its nadir under State President P.W. Botha's National Party-led government.

In 1987, Rabie was fired by Rapport for using quotes from Botha's speeches in his music; he then became a full-time musician and performer under the name Johannes Kerkorrel en die Gereformeerde Blues Band (Johannes Kerkorrel and the Reformed Blues Band), a deliberate reference to the Reformed Church. The band also included the Afrikaans singer-songwriter Koos Kombuis. Their brand of new Afrikaans music was dubbed alternatiewe Afrikaans (alternative Afrikaans) and exposed divergent political views to a new generation of Afrikaners.

In 1985, they released the album Eet Kreef (Eat Crayfish) on the now-defunct Shifty Records label, which was a commercial success despite its tracks being banned from radio airplay by the state-controlled South African Broadcasting Corporation, which was the government mouthpiece. Colloquially, 'Eet Kreef' is ambiguous, meaning either 'Enjoy!' or 'Get lost!'. The subsequent regional tour of college campuses and art festivals was called Voëlvry (literally free as a bird but here meaning outlawed), and Rabie's controversial reinvention of Afrikaans popular music became known as the Voëlvry movement.

In 1990, Rabie visited Amsterdam, and almost simultaneously the track "Hillbrow" from the Eet Kreef album became a hit in Belgium, and Rabie followed its success with a solo tour. In subsequent years he enjoyed substantial artistic success in Belgium and the Netherlands, and spent much of his time in Belgium.  Here he also befriended Stef Bos, a Dutch cabaret artist, with whom he would share a number of concerts.

Death
Rabie hanged himself on 12 November 2002 in Kleinmond, near Hermanus on the Western Cape coast on a tree that is alien to South Africa. He was survived by his long-term partner, and by his ex-wife and son.

Awards
1995 SAMA – Best Pop Music Performance for Cyanide in the Beefcake
1997 SAMA – Best Male Vocalist and Best Adult Contemporary Album: Afrikaans for Ge-trans-for-meer
2001 Geraas – Best pop album and Best adaptation for Die Ander Kant
2013 SAMA – Lifetime Achievement Award

Discography
 Eet Kreef (1989)
 Bloudruk (1992)
 Cyanide in the Beefcake (1994) 
 Ge-trans-for-meer (1996) 
 Tien Jaar Later (1998)
 Sing Koos du Plessis (1999)
 Die Ander Kant (2000)
 Voëlvry Die Toer (2002)
 Kerkorrel – Best Of: Pêrels Voor Die Swyne (2003)
 Hoe Ek Voel (2012) – issued to commemorate the 10 year anniversary of Rabie's death

Tributes
After Rabie's death, several artists recorded tribute songs to his life and work. An incomplete list follows:
 Stef Bos – Pelgrimsrus
 Riku Lätti – Ysbeer
 Amanda Strydom – Ek Het Gedroom
 Karen Zoid – Foto Teen Die Muur
 Jak De Priester – Kerkorrel
 Kristoe Strauss – Sit Dit Self Af
 Jan Blohm – Johnny K
 Valiant Swart - Sonvanger
 Valiant Swart en Koos Kombuis – Kleinmond Koebaai
 Koos Kombuis - Johnny is nie dood nie  - This cannot be a post-mortem tribute since this song was published some 8 years before Kerkorrel's death.

Covers
Rabie is a much covered artist. Among the cover versions that exist are: 
 Stef Bos – Hillbrow
 Riku Lätti – Somer
 Amanda Strydom – Hoe Ek Voel and Halala Afrika
 Van Coke Kartel - Energie
 :af:Refentse Morake - Halala Afrika

Legacy
The film Johnny is nie dood nie portrays a fictional group of friends meeting up after his suicide, looking back to the events leading up to the Voëlvry movement, and how his music inspired and influenced them.

See also 
 Bernoldus Niemand
 Koos Kombuis

References

Further reading

 

 

1960 births
2002 suicides
20th-century dramatists and playwrights
20th-century South African male writers
20th-century South African male singers
Afrikaans-language singers
Gay dramatists and playwrights
South African LGBT singers
South African LGBT songwriters
South African LGBT dramatists and playwrights
Gay singers
Gay songwriters
South African gay musicians
South African gay writers
South African dramatists and playwrights
South African journalists
South African musicians
South African singer-songwriters
Suicides by hanging in South Africa
20th-century journalists
Afrikaner anti-apartheid activists
20th-century South African LGBT people
21st-century South African LGBT people
Singers from Johannesburg